Crumlin is a town in County Antrim, Northern Ireland. Belfast International Airport lies just north of the village at Aldergrove. It had a population of 5,140 people in the 2011 Census. It is part of Antrim and Newtownabbey district. It also hosts the headquarters of Lidl in Northern Ireland.

History

The town's old linen mill was built in 1809.

In 1972, during The Troubles, a bomb went off prematurely near Crumlin, killing two IRA members.

Education 
Crumlin Integrated College
St. Joseph's Primary School
Crumlin Integrated Primary
Gaelscoil Ghleann Darach
Naíscoil Ghleann Darach
Sleepy Hollow Day Nursery - offering day care and early education, including only two year old programme in the village known as Eager and Able to Learn

Irish language
In recent years, a growing Irish-speaking community has evolved in the area and Crumlin now caters for both pre-school and primary school education through the medium of Irish. Naíscoil and Gaelscoil Ghleann Darach now has almost 70 children attending the Irish medium school and almost 30 in the nursery, with 15 members of staff. The Gaelscoil (primary school) is recognised by the Department of Education.

Two voluntary groups, Cumann Gaeilge and Cairde Ghleann Darach, encourage and support the school and promotion of the Irish language. The local societies help organise fund-raisers for the local schools and clubs and organise Irish language classes, an annual Irish language funday, a céilí, a bi-lingual pub quiz, and other events in the area.

Early Years Provision and Day Care 

Crumlin hosts one of Ireland's few All Ireland Centre of Excellence accredited nurseries. Sleepy Hollow, based at Largy Road, has been established for almost 30 years. It offers the highest standards of care for the under 12's and this has been recognised by Early Years and Early Childhood Ireland who awarded this accolade to Sleepy Hollow. The setting also offers a unique 2-3 year old programme four mornings per week which follows the Queen's University research based Eager and Able to Learn curriculum. Sleepy Hollow operates a Reggio Emilia Approach in the setting for the under 5's and a playwork curriculum based on Bob Hughes 'playtypes' for school age children.  Sleepy Hollow is also the largest childcare provider in Northern Ireland.

Sport
Crumlin United F.C provides association football for more than 300 men, women, boys and girls, from under-6 to senior level.  Broader membership of approx. 400.  Crumlin United are proud owners of a 9-acre ground on Mill Road in the centre of the village,  this wonderful facility consists of one of the best grass playing surfaces in the country and a recently constructed a full size 3G playing service.  It also has a two-story Clubhouse with a fully licensed Bar and Lounge, which is open 7 days a week.  On the pitch Crumlin United 1st XI recently reached the semi-final of the Steel and Sons cup losing 1-0 to Newington FC.  This in turn qualifies Crumlin United to enter the County Antrim Senior Shield in 2018, bringing competitive Senior Football to the village of Crumlin for the first time in history.

Aldergrove GAC, a well established Gaelic Athletic Association with 13 teams incorporating men's and ladies football as well as being strongly represented at all levels underage. The club currently has a player base in excess of 300 and broader membership of approx. 500. The Club, based on Glenavy Road in the village, provides structured Gaelic football boys and girls, as well as social and cultural events. The senior men's team was promoted to Division 1 in 2012 for the first time in the club's history and stayed there until relegation in 2017. They also won the Antrim Intermediate Championship in 2019 for the first time since 1977 and will now represent Antrim in the Ulster Intermediate Championship.

Community relations
In recent decades Crumlin's population has increased as a result of an influx of residents from Belfast and surrounding areas. The majority of these residents are from an Irish nationalist background and as a result, Crumlin now has a nationalist majority. Until recently, Orange Order parades still occurred without incident and the main street in July is decorated with an Orange Arch which flies unionist flags from it.

In 2012, The Twelfth celebration for a wider area was held in Crumlin for the first time in 12 years, a march which surpassed previous parades in terms of size and the number of bands and participants taking part. Some pre-march tension was evident and a Parades Commission determination appeared to rule in favour of the residents opposed to the parade based on its size and because they felt they weren't given adequate notice by the organisers of the parade.

Talks were held between the residents and organisers, leading to the parade passing off peacefully. The agreement was heralded as a success and as a possible blueprint for other contentious marches.

Demography
In the 2011 Census Crumlin had a population of 5,140 people (1,777 households).
On Census day in 2011:
27.4% were aged under 16 and 9.5% were aged 65 and over
48.3% of the population were male and 51.7% were female
80.3% were from a Catholic background and 16.7% were from a Protestant or other Christian background
4.2% of people aged 16–74 were unemployed.

Transport
Crumlin railway station opened on 13 November 1871 but is now closed

Translink runs an Ulsterbus service from Crumlin to Lisburn, Antrim, Belfast International Airport and Belfast city centre.

References 

Villages in County Antrim